Emiliano Romero may refer to:

 Emiliano Romero (footballer, born 1985), Argentine football player for Oriente Petrolero
 Emiliano Romero (footballer, born 1992), Uruguayan football player for Juventud de Las Piedras